The 2400 class was a class of diesel locomotives built by Clyde Engineering, Eagle Farm for Queensland Railways in 1977-1978.

History
The 2400 class were an evolution of the 1550 class. They differed in having the modular control system incorporated into the electrical cabinet. Originally it was intended to continue their number sequence from the last 1550, i.e. the first would have been 1577, but this would have required the 1600 class to have been renumbered, so they were instead numbered as the 2400 class.

Between 1999 and 2002, eighteen were rebuilt as 2300 class locomotives at Redbank Railway Workshops. The remaining six were withdrawn with one exported in August 2013 to South Africa.

References

Clyde Engineering locomotives
Co-Co locomotives
Diesel locomotives of Queensland
Queensland Rail locomotives
Railway locomotives introduced in 1977
3 ft 6 in gauge locomotives of Australia
Diesel-electric locomotives of Australia

Sports